The Netherlands sent competitors to the 2018 Winter Paralympics in Pyeongchang, South Korea.  Four people competed in para-snowboarding.  Five people competed in para-alpine skiing. Anna Jochemsen and Jeffrey Stuut are standing skiers. Linda van Impelen, Jeroen Kampschreur and Niels de Langen have all competed in all 5 para-alpine sit-ski events.   Lisa Bunschoten, Bibian Mentel and Chris Vos all competed at the 2014 Winter Paralympics in Sochi. Renske van Beek was the only snowboarder on Team Netherlands who did not go to Sochi.

Team 
There were four people who competed in the Paralympics in para-snowboarding.  There were another five people who competed in para-alpine skiing.

The table below contains the list of members of people (called "Team NL") that participated in the 2018 Games.

Medalists

| width="78%" align="left" valign="top" |

| width="22%" align="left" valign="top" |

Para-alpine skiing 

Anna Jochemsen and Jeffrey Stuut are standing skiers. Linda van Impelen, Jeroen Kampschreur and Niels de Langen have all competed in all 5 para-alpine sit-ski events.  Kampschreur went to his first Winter Paralympics as the world champion in slalom, giant slalom and super-combined.

Men

Women

Para-snowboarding 

Bibian Mentel-Spee has competed at the Paralympics before, winning several medals. Chris Vos won the World Para Snowboarding Championships four times.  Lisa Bunschoten, Mentel-Spee and Vos all competed at the 2014 Winter Paralympics in Sochi. Renske van Beek was the only snowboarded on Team Netherlands who did not go to Sochi.  The South Korea Games are her first.

Chris Vos celebrated his 20th birthday in February. Despite his young age, people thought he could win a medal at the 2018 Winter Games. During the 2017-2018 snowboarding season, his results were not consistent but his speed was very good.  The lack of consistency was why some people thought he might not be able to win gold.

Banked slalom

Snowboardcross

Supporters 
Princess Margriet of the Netherlands attended the 2018 Winter Paralympics.  She is a member of the Honorary Board of the International Paralympic Committee. She arrived 8 March 2018 and left 13 March 2018.

References 

2018
Nations at the 2018 Winter Paralympics
2018 in Dutch sport